The Liberation of Skopje (Osloboduvanje na Skopje) is a 2016 Macedonian drama film directed by Rade Šerbedžija and Danilo Šerbedžija. The film was selected as the Macedonian entry for the Best Foreign Language Film at the 89th Academy Awards but it was not nominated.

Cast
 Rade Šerbedžija as Gjorgjija
 Lucija Šerbedžija as Lica
 Silvija Stojanovska as Lenche
 David Todosovski as Zoran
 Mikko Nousiainen as Hans
 Nebojsa Glogovac as Dushan
 Deniz Abdula as Bale
 Kire Acevski as Bugarski Branik
 Stefan Arsic as Orhan
 Hristina Dimovska as Anica
 Eleonora Gievska as Biba
 Antti Luusuaniemi as Polkovnik Herzog

See also
 List of submissions to the 89th Academy Awards for Best Foreign Language Film
 List of Macedonian submissions for the Academy Award for Best Foreign Language Film
 Capture of Skopje (1944)

References

External links
 

2016 films
2016 drama films
2016 war drama films
2016 directorial debut films
Macedonian drama films
Macedonian-language films
2010s German-language films
2010s Bulgarian-language films
Finnish war drama films
Croatian war drama films
War films set in Partisan Yugoslavia
Croatian World War II films
2016 multilingual films
Finnish multilingual films
Croatian multilingual films
Macedonian multilingual films